Edward Scott (died 1868) was a British Conservative Party politician.

Scott was elected Conservative MP for Maidstone at the 1857 general election and held the seat until 1859 when he did not seek re-election.

References

External links
 

Conservative Party (UK) MPs for English constituencies
UK MPs 1857–1859
1868 deaths
Year of birth missing